La Palmyre Zoo (French: Zoo de La Palmyre) is a zoo in Les Mathes, Charente-Maritime, near Royan, in southwestern France. It was created in 1966 in the forest of la Coubre by  Claude Caillé.

History 
La Palmyre Zoo officially opened its doors in 1966, but the project really began in a semi-official way in 1957, thanks to the efforts of its founder, Claude Caillé.

He was the son of a newspaperman, with whom he started working at the age of 14. In his twenties he met his future wife, Irene, whose brother had a small zoological gardens in Croustille, close to Limoges. It was through his frequent visits helping his brother-in-law that Claude Caillé discovered his passion for animals. Consequently, he became interested and went on to study zoology.

A traveling zoo
In 1957, accompanied by his wife and their two children, Patrick and Bruno, he began with a small travelling zoo which he exhibited in schools, traveling through France. In the 1960s he decided to leave for Africa to capture animals. After a stay among Pygmies, he brought gorillas and chimpanzees  back from Cameroon.

He left then to Kenya where, helped by Kĩkũyũ, he captured zebras, antelopes and giraffes, but did not have sufficient money to pay the taxes and the transportation for the animals. He returned then to France, but returned three months later with the money necessary. However, the animals entrusted to his team had disappeared, killed meanwhile by Kĩkũyũ. Claude Caillé then took up the school road and rounds for three years.

Creation of the zoo of La Palmyre
On returning to Kenya, he joined Carr-Hartley who captured and provided animals to zoos around the whole world. This time the operation succeeded, and he returned then to France with a livestock of exotic animals, and settled in Palmyre in the heart of a forest of maritime pines and holm oaks, near the beaches of the Atlantic ocean.

In June 1966, the zoo opened its doors with 60 animals spread over 3 hectares. At the end of August, the park recorded 129,500 visitors. With growing success, the zoo grew and accommodated newcomers. At that time, the animals of the zoo were regarded as forming members of the family and, thus, babies which mothers abandoned were suckled with feeding-bottles.

Today however, in order to avoid denaturing them, the animals are not fed in the nursery but by their parents. It is done only in exceptional cases, such as - abandonment of babies, lack of milk or mother's instinct, or death of the mother.

Some outstanding facts
In 1976 many animals were evacuated because of a large fire which devastated the forest of Coubre and threatened the zoo, and which died out a few hundred meters from the zoo.

In October 2000, a female cheetah born in 1992, exhibited salivary and locomotive disorders. Despite all care taken, the general state of the animal degraded, Doctor Thierry Petit was obliged to euthanize it in February 2001. The probe carried out by the French Agency of medical safety of food (AFSSA) of Lyon highlighted the fact that the animal had bovine spongiform encephalopathy (BSE), more commonly known by the name "mad cow disease". It was the first case of BSE in an animal born in France. The animal could have been contaminated by pieces of meat, soiled by remainders of nervous systems, given to cat-like animals in addition to their ration containing chicken. It was the only case that affected the zoo.

Recent news
600 birds in the zoo were vaccinated in 2014 against the new strain of the avian influenza that can be transmitted by migrating wild birds. After full containment in late 2014 and the partial containment with biosecurity measures at the beginning of 2015, it became difficult to keep the birds confined in buildings or pens, especially as the tourist season was beginning and therefore vaccination was carried out. The park has previously carried our vaccinations against avian influenza.

Certain rare species, like Bali starling, from which there remain only some pairs in the world, needed particular care from a possible epizootic of aviary influenza.

In October 2005, Claude Caillé officially took his retirement, and was succeeded by his son, Patrick Caillé.

A male 12 years old Amur tiger, left Palmyre Zoo in June 2006 to join Toundra, a female of the zoo of Amnéville.

The heat wave of the summer 2006 required setting up of special devices for certain animals, in particular for the African penguins, for which an atomiser was installed.

Conservation and international co-operation
Particularly sensitized with the conservation of threatened species, the zoo of Palmyre is member many recognized international associations, such as:
 the World Association of the zoos and aquariums (WAZA)
 the European Association of the zoos and aquariums (EAZA)
 the national Association of the zoological gardens (ANPZ)
 the Action for the safeguarding of the primates of West Africa (WAPCA)

It is also one of the founding members of the Conservation of the species and the animal populations (CEPA). This association created in 1997, concentrates its actions on the species seriously threatened and generally neglected like the leopard or the Tahiti monarch. A very detailed attention is given to the fauna of the Overseas departments and territories of France.

In 2002, the zoo of Palmyre joined the European Association for the study and the conservation of the lemurs (AEECL) which includes about fifteen zoos. The initiative of this action goes to the zoos of Mulhouse, Cologne and Saarbrücken and the University of Strasbourg. Association manages a programme of European breeding in controlled environment (zoological gardens) and collects funds which are used for creation of a zone protected in Madagascar for the blue-eyed black lemur.

Thanks to its remarkable birth rate, the zoo is able to adhere to many programmes of safeguard of species in the process of extinction. In 2006 for example, the zoo took part in 36 European breeding programs, thus, a quarter of the 130 species which it shelters is the subject of an international program of breeding. Among these list, one finds the gorilla of the plains, the orangutan of Borneo, the scimitar oryx, or the golden lion tamarin of South America.

Threatened species

Scimitar oryx
Hardly less than about thirty years it still occupied the whole of Sahara, the oryx is today at the edge of extinction, victim of hunting (for its horns) and of the human activities. The last representatives of the species, estimated at about thirty individuals, do not remain any more but in two isolated pockets, one in Chad and the other in Niger. This is why the oryx is the subject of European programs of breeding (EEP) in which the zoo of Palmyre is actively involved.

Om March 11, 1999, fourteen individuals coming from seven European zoological gardens, including two males raised at the zoo of Palmyre, were reintroduced in Tunisia, in the reserve of Sidi Toui, in order to form a reproductive core. Once the newly introduced animals reach a sufficient number and that the local population will have learned how to coexist with them, they will be released in the desert.

Orangutan of Borneo
The orangutans are threatened with extinction because of the disappearance of their natural habitat, the tropical forests of Sumatra and Borneo. It is estimated that 30 to 50% of the wild populations of orangutans were decimated in the last ten years. Today, the last wild populations remain mainly out of the protected reserves, in degraded zones subjected to human exploitation (deforestation, and agriculture). To date, the populations of orangutans in their natural habitat were never studied and it is generally believed that they are heading towards a fast extinction.

This is why in addition to its implication in the European programs of breeding, the zoo of Palmyre finances many in situ protection or research programs, i.e. in the countries of origin of the animals, in particular of the programs aiming at protecting the orangutan and also gibbons.

Golden lion tamarin
In 1992, the zoo sent a family of tamarins lions to Brazil within the framework of a rescue operation of this species, threatened since the end of 1960 because of the forestry development and the extension of the human population.

In 1995, there were approximately 500 tamarins lions in the wild, 125 of them had been reintroduced or had been born to reintroduced individuals. These 125 monkeys lived in 26 groups.

In 1999, the population of animals reintroduced or resulting from reintroduced animals was composed of 43 groups including 302 monkeys. They live in the reserve of Poço das Antas (5500 hectares and more than 20 years of existence) and in 15 private programs.

Today, thanks to the programs of reintroduction carried out by the zoos, their population has gone up to 1000 individuals, against hardly 200 in 1970. It is estimated that the optimal capacity of reception of these supervised forests is reached.

Asian elephant
The zoo of Palmyre has a reproductive bull elephant, Shinto (born in 1969), arrived on January 25, 1983, coming from the zoological gardens of Fréjus, like two females, Alix (born in 1983) and Malicia (born in 1984), both arrived on January 11, 1991. The first birth of elephant calf in the zoo was on the October 26, 1995, when Alix gave birth to Homaline. It was followed by Jacky on July 7, 1996, which was transferred to the zoo of Pont-Scorff on October 9, 2001, then to the zoo of Ostrava on October 12, 2004, where it died on March 25, 2005. Then there was Maurice on June 16, 2001, and Angèle on November 5, 2001. Lately, it is Ziha who was born on January 27, 2006.

These births are of primary importance for the program of European breeding, because they remain rare. In France, since closing for maintenance of the zoological gardens of Vincennes, only the zoo of Palmyre controls the reproduction of the Asian elephants.

The Asian elephants are decreasing in nature, and the captive population difficult to be maintain without a sufficient manpower. To keep a reproductive male requires installations and a follow-up personnel, that is why few zoological establishments have given up trying the reproduction of these pachyderms.

White rhinoceros 
In June 2006, the zoo of Palmyre, which has two white rhinoceroses (Whi and Noëlle), joined conservation campaign of the rhinoceros organized by the Association European of the zoos and aquariums (EAZA), and intended to collect 350 000 € in order to finance a minimum of 13 programmes of conservation of the rhinoceroses in Africa and Asia.

These animals, very abundant still a few decades ago, today are threatened by extinction, not only because of the destruction of their habitat, but especially due to poaching for their horns, which although being made up only of simple keratin, like the nails and the hair, are very coveted by Chinese traditional medicine or for the manufacture of handles of daggers in Yemen. The world population exceeded more than 2 million individuals at the beginning of the 19th century, to 30,000 approximately today, all species together.

The zoo of Palmyre also takes part in research programs undertaken by schools veterinary surgeons and institutes of research concerning the reproduction of the white rhinoceroses.

The zoo of La Palmyre in figures

Financial aspect
Important economic factor for the région Nouvelle-Aquitaine, with his 750 000 entries (including 10% from school) and 9 million € of sales turnover, represents with Futuroscope of Poitiers (1 200 000 entries) and the Aquarium of La Rochelle (850 000 entries) 50% of the entries and half of the income of the activities of leisure in the area. It is the zoological gardens of France with the largest number of visitors.

The zoo of La Palmyre
 14 hectares arranged;
 130 species;
 1600 animals;
 750 000 paying entries per annum;
 16 000 € necessary each day for the operation of the park;
 55 employees at the year and 110 in season;
 9 million € of sales turnover.

Food consumed by the animals
The 1600 animals of Palmyre represents large quantities of food to be fed. For example, each year consumed food is:
 250 tons of fodder and 70 tons of straw consumed by the herbivores, giraffes, elephants, antelopes, zebras, rhinoceros, etc.
 180 tons of fresh fruit and vegetables soups by the gorillas, orangutans, marmoset, ring-tailed lemur, lemurs, kangaroos, bats, etc.
 50 tons of meat per the carnivores, lions, panthers, tigers, jaguars, lynx, polar bear, etc.
 30 tons of feeding stuffs compound by the flamingos, monkeys, pandas, etc.
 20 tons of fish by the otaries, penguins of the course, polar bears, pelicans, otters, etc.
 10 tons of various seeds, corn, etc., by hornbill, macaw, eastern rosella, calaos, turaco, Nicobar pigeons, etc.

Activity at the zoo
The zoo is open year-round, and is entirely accessible to the handicapped people, has free car parking, and offers places for relaxing and eating inside the park.

Attractions
In addition to the presentation of many animals in an environment nearest possible to their natural habitat, the zoo offers from April until the end of October shows of sea lions of California, as well as shows of parrots and cockatoos.

The team of the zoo
 Chairman and managing Director: Patrick Caillé
 Veterinary surgeon: Thierry Petit
 Decorator: Nadu Marsaudon
 Architect: Jean Michel Paulet

References

External links

Buildings and structures in Charente-Maritime
Zoos in France
Tourist attractions in Charente-Maritime
Zoos established in 1966
1966 establishments in France
Organizations based in Charente-Maritime